Harold I. Lief (1917–2007) was an American psychiatrist and psychoanalyst. He was famous as an advocate of sex education. Lief is credited with the introduction in the DSM of the "inhibited sexual desire".

Early life and education
Lief, who was born in Brooklyn, attended the University of Michigan and graduated from the New York University School of Medicine in 1942. Lief's psychoanalytic training was at Columbia University.

Career

While a professor of psychiatry at the University of Pennsylvania, Lief started organizing the Center for the Study of Sex Education in Medicine In 1960.  At the time, there were only three other medical schools with separate programs in sexology.

References

American psychiatrists
1917 births
2007 deaths
American psychoanalysts
Sex educators
University of Michigan alumni
New York University Grossman School of Medicine alumni
Tulane University faculty